is a railway station in the city of Tōno, Iwate, Japan, operated by East Japan Railway Company (JR East).

Lines
Iwate-Kamigō Station is served by the Kamaishi Line, and is located 53.8 kilometers from the terminus of the line at Hanamaki Station.

Station layout
The station has a single island platform, serving two tracks. The platforms are not numbered The station is unattended.

Platforms

History
The station began serving passengers from 15 May 1914. The station was renamed Iwate-Kamigō on 10 February 1916.

The line was nationalized in August 1936, becoming the Kamaishi Line. The station was absorbed into the JR East network upon the privatization of the Japanese National Railways (JNR) on 1 April 1987.

Surrounding area
 Iwate-Kamigō Post Office
 
 
 Hirakura Kannon

See also
 List of railway stations in Japan

References

External links

  

Railway stations in Iwate Prefecture
Kamaishi Line
Railway stations in Japan opened in 1914
Tōno, Iwate
Stations of East Japan Railway Company